Practical Joke is a 2008 Russian romantic drama directed by Andrei Kudinenko. It is a remake of the 1977 film of the same name by Vladimir Menshov.

Plot
The action takes place in an average Moscow school. It all starts with a joke by class leader Oleg Komarov - he persuades classmates to make fun of the young English language trainee in retaliation for a barely passing grade. At the same time, a new student appears in the class - Igor Glushko. The new kid amazes the teacher with his knowledge of English during his first lesson. He also writes songs and dreams of creating a music group. Komarov understands that his leader’s position has suffered damage, and tries to rectify the situation.
After the first practical joke, the intern realizes who was the one who made it and gives Komarov a failing grade for his homework. Komarov’s father, who sponsors the school, threatens Oleg with the army and punishes him. After that, Oleg decides to arrange a second, more brutal practical joke. The practical joke is successful, but everything comes to light, and it is decided that Komarov be expelled from school. But suddenly the head teacher of the school calls everyone for mercy and offers to leave Komarov at school and that he be allowed to take exams.

Cast
Evgeny Dmitriev – Oleg Komarov
Ivan Alekseev– Igor Glushko
Maria Gorban – Tanya Nesterova
Claudia Korshunova – Taya Petrova
Donatas Grudovich – Ilya Korbut
Andrei Nazimov – Gera Zorin-Krotov
Andrey Zhemchuzhny – Yasha Zhemchuzhny
Irina Kupchenko– Maria Vasilievna, head teacher
Yury Kuznetsov – Michal Mikhalych, Director
Yana Esipovich – Vera Ivanovna, English teacher
Dmitri Dyuzhev – Alexander Ivanovich, physical education teacher
Evdokiya Germanova – Tay's mother
Dmitry Kharatyan – Komarov's father
Sergey Yushkevich – father of Zorin-Krotov
Vsevolod Yashkin – Andrey Nikitin
Alla Podchufarova – Baburkina
Anna Kornilova – Alisa
Ekaterina Kudinskaya – Ekaterina Moiseeva
Darina Faldeeva – Komarov's sister
Vera Zotova – Komarov's mother
Natalia Evstigneeva – computer science teacher
Vladimir Sychev – guard

References

External links 
 

2008 films
2008 romantic drama films
Russian romantic drama films
Russian rock music films
Russian teen films
Films set in schools
Remakes of Russian films